The brownband numbfish (Diplobatis guamachensis) is a species of fish in the family Narcinidae found in eastern Colombia, Venezuela and Trinidad and Tobago. Its natural habitat is open seas.

References

brownband numbfish
Fish of Venezuela
Fish of Trinidad and Tobago
Strongly electric fish
brownband numbfish
Taxonomy articles created by Polbot